SSLBridge is a simple, lightweight web-based interface that allow computers access to a network using Samba.

SSLBridge users log in and navigate the network using an intuitive explorer-style interface programmed in Ajax to make it nearly as responsive as a desktop application.

External links
 SSLBridge Website Internet archive link
 Forums 
 Download

Unix network-related software